Jelica Komnenović (born 20 April 1960) is a former basketball player who competed for Yugoslavia in the 1980 Summer Olympics and in the 1984 Summer Olympics.

References

1960 births
Living people
People from Foča
Olympic basketball players of Yugoslavia
ŽKK Partizan players
Basketball players at the 1980 Summer Olympics
Basketball players at the 1984 Summer Olympics
Olympic bronze medalists for Yugoslavia
Olympic medalists in basketball
Yugoslav women's basketball players
Serbian women's basketball players
Serbs of Bosnia and Herzegovina
Medalists at the 1980 Summer Olympics
Universiade medalists in basketball
Universiade gold medalists for Yugoslavia
Universiade bronze medalists for Yugoslavia
Medalists at the 1983 Summer Universiade
Medalists at the 1987 Summer Universiade